Biomphalaria stanleyi is a species of air-breathing freshwater snail, an aquatic pulmonate gastropod mollusk in the family Planorbidae, the ram's horn snails.

Distribution 
This species is African, and occurs in:
 Lake Albert, Uganda. (Lake Albert is between Uganda and Democratic Republic of the Congo)
 Lake Chad
 Lake Cohoha in Burundi

Phylogeny 
A cladogram showing phylogenic relations of species in the genus Biomphalaria:

Ecology 
Biomphalaria stanleyi is found in deeper water in Lake Albert.

Parasites of Biomphalaria stanleyi include Schistosoma mansoni.

References

Biomphalaria
Gastropods described in 1888